Llorne Gregory Howell (born 8 July 1972) is a former New Zealand international cricketer. His career started well, with Howell captaining the New Zealand national under-19 cricket team Under-19 side in Youth Tests and One Day Internationals in 1990/91 and 1991/92. 

Howell went on to make his senior One Day International debut in Sharjah in 1998, but he never played Tests as his style of batting was considered unsuitable for the longer-form game. An unexpected serious shoulder surgery meant he played only 12 ODIs.

References

1972 births
Living people
New Zealand cricketers
Auckland cricketers
Canterbury cricketers
Central Districts cricketers
Northern Districts cricketers
New Zealand Youth One Day International captains
New Zealand Youth Test captains
New Zealand One Day International cricketers
Cricketers from Napier, New Zealand